Camille Dreyfus may refer to:
Camille Ferdinand Dreyfus (1849–1915), French lawyer and politician
Camille Dreyfus (chemist) (1878–1956), Swiss-American chemist, inventor and businessman
The Camille and Henry Dreyfus Foundation
Ferdinand-Camille Dreyfus (1851–1915), French journalist and politician